Jacques Raymond (born Jozef Remon on 13 October 1938) is a Belgian singer.

He represented Belgium in the Eurovision Song Contest 1963 with the Dutch song "Waarom?". In the 1971 Eurovision Song Contest, he teamed up with Lily Castel to sing "Goeiemorgen, Morgen" for the Belgian entry on short notice after Nicole Josy of Nicole & Hugo fell ill.

Discography
 Goeiemorgen, morgen
 Heel veel liefs en tot ziens
 Ik blijf op je wachten
 Klappen in de handen
 Jouw good-bye
 Onder 't groen van de bomen
 You're so simpatico
 Slotakkoord
 Permettete, signorina
 Tannia

Singles

 Waarom (1963)
 Die dolle Dolly (1964)
 Keine Freunde (1968)
 Nooit was ik zo verliefd
 Nina
 Sylvie

References

See also
Belgium in the Eurovision Song Contest

1938 births
Living people
Belgian male singers
Eurovision Song Contest entrants for Belgium
Belgian pop singers
Eurovision Song Contest entrants of 1963
Eurovision Song Contest entrants of 1971
People from Temse